The 14th annual MTV European Music Awards were held at the Olympiahalle in Munich, Germany on 1 November 2007. The show received a total of 78 million votes, the most in MTV Europe Music Awards history.

Foo Fighters opened the show, with frontman Dave Grohl hosting the VIP 'Glamour Pit' area, interviewing celebrities live on air. Other performances on the night included Avril Lavigne, Amy Winehouse with "Back to Black", Tokio Hotel, will.i.am and Babyshambles.

Presenters on the night included Joss Stone, model Lily Cole, R.E.M.'s Michael Stipe and F1 driver Lewis Hamilton.

Nominations
Winners are in bold text.

Regional nominations
Winners are in bold text.

New Sounds of Europe competition

Regional competition

International competition
 Bedwetters
 Firma
 Yakup
 Sunrise Avenue — Eliminated on 28/10
 Christophe Willem — Eliminated on 27/10
 Jaula de Grillos — Eliminated on 26/10
 Buraka Som Sistema — Eliminated on 25/10
 Chakuza — Eliminated on 24/10
 Klaxons — Eliminated on 23/10 (replace James Morisson because that wasn't available to perform in event)
 Neverstore — Eliminated on 22/10
 Zero Assoluto — Eliminated on 21/10
 Delain — Eliminated on 20/10
 Dani — Eliminated on 19/10
 Gravel — Eliminated on 18/10
 Coma — Eliminated on 17/10
 Alphabeat — Eliminated on 16/10
 Aleksander With — Eliminated on 15/10
 Astro'n'out — Eliminated on 14/10

Performances

Appearances 
Benji Madden and Joel Madden — presented Best Album
Michael Stipe — presented Artist's Choice Award
Lewis Hamilton — presented Best Song
Alan Green and Mike Ingham — presented Best Video
Franka Potente and Serj Tankian — presented Best Rock
Didier Drogba and Lily Cole — presented Best Group
Wyclef Jean and Craig David — presented Best Urban
Joss Stone and Paul Van Dyk — presented Best Inter Act
Boris Becker and Jens Lehmann — presented Best Live Act
John Heder — presented Best Artist

See also
2007 MTV Video Music Awards

External links
MTV Europe Official site
MTV Europe Music Awards Official show site
"MTV adds new category to EMAs" Digital Spy, June 18, 2007
The Show

2007 music awards
2007 in Germany
2000s in Munich
2007 in German music
November 2007 events in Europe
2007
Culture in Munich